John Lebar is a British actor known for his giant stature; standing at .

In 2007 he starred as a plague doctor in The Sick House.

Lebar portrays one of the Space Jockey aliens seen in Ridley Scott's  2012 science fiction film, Prometheus.

Filmography
The League of Gentlemen: "Destination: Royston Vasey" (2000) as Irish Giant
Lexx: "Viva Lexx Vegas" (2002) as Mummy
Ordan's Forest (2005) as Ordan
Brainiac Science Abuse (2006) as Tall John
The Sickhouse (2007) as Plague Doctor
Crooked House (2008) as The Abomination
Sherlock (2010) as Golem – Episode: "The Great Game"
Prometheus (2012) as Ghost Engineer

References

External links

British male film actors
British male television actors
Living people
People with gigantism
Year of birth missing (living people)